Caladenia argocalla, commonly known as white beauty spider orchid, is a plant in the orchid family Orchidaceae and is endemic to South Australia. It is a ground orchid which grows singly or in loose groups and has a single, hairy leaf and one or two white to greenish-white flowers on a wiry, hairy stalk. The total population is thought to be between 2,000 and 4,500 and it is classed as an "Endangered" species.

Description
Caladenia argocalla is a terrestrial, perennial, deciduous, herb with an underground tuber and a single hairy, linear to narrow lance-shaped leaf. The leaf appears in April or May but leaves or flowers do not appear every year, the number of flowering plants fluctuating from year to year.

The labellum is egg-shaped to heart-shaped, erect near its base but curves forward, especially towards its end. Flowering occurs from September to October.

Taxonomy and naming
Caladenia argocalla was first formally described by David L. Jones in 1991 and the description was published in Australian Orchid Research. The type specimen was collected near Kapunda. The specific epithet (argocalla) is derived from the Ancient Greek words argos meaning "white" and kallos meaning "beautiful" in reference to the common name.

Distribution and habitat
White beauty spider orchid grows on hills and slopes in forest, usually with sheoaks. It is only known from thirteen subpopulations in the hills north of Adelaide, including in the Spring Gully Conservation Park.

Conservation
The total size of the population of this species in 2006 was estimated to be between 2,000 and 4,500 individuals. The main threats to its survival are considered to be habitat degradation, weed invasion, lack of pollinators and grazing by native, domestic and feral animals. It is classified as "Endangered" under the South Australian National Parks and Wildlife Act 1972 and the Commonwealth Government Environment Protection and Biodiversity Conservation Act 1999 (EPBC) Act.

References

aestiva
Plants described in 1991
Endemic orchids of Australia
Orchids of South Australia
Taxa named by David L. Jones (botanist)